Ludwig Waldschmidt (6 December 1886 – 1 January 1957) was a German painter. His work was part of the painting event in the art competition at the 1932 Summer Olympics.

References

1886 births
1957 deaths
20th-century German painters
20th-century German male artists
German male painters
Olympic competitors in art competitions
People from Kaiserslautern